Lisbon, Arkansas is a location or community in Union County, Arkansas.  It is the location of the Mount Moriah Masonic Lodge No. 18, which is listed on the National Register of Historic Places.

References

Populated places in Union County, Arkansas